Get Ready for Eytan! is the second album recorded by singer-songwriter Eytan Mirsky, released in 1999.

Track listing
 "Outta Sight"
 "What Do I Do?"
 "Life of a Pretty Girl"
 "Somebody to Blame"
 "Allergic to Fun"
 "Tell Me That You're Foolin'"
 "Found"
 "Weren't You the One?"
 "The Vulture of Love"
 "All the Guys You Loved Before"
 "Either Way"
 "Something About the Night"

Bonus tracks

1999 albums